"Boy" is the 1985 debut single by the American synth-pop band Book of Love. The song was included on the band's eponymous debut album Book of Love in 1986.

Background
"Boy" was written by band member Theodore ("Ted") Ottaviano and features a prominent Chimes melody. The band secured a recording contract when the demo of the song was given to DJ/producer Ivan Ivan, who then passed it along to Seymour Stein of Sire Records.

The song is said to describe the frustrations of a woman with an affection for "a boy who likes boys", with songwriter Ted Ottaviano adding in a 2016 Village Voice interview that the song was "written about Boy Bar, which was a very exclusive gay club in the East Village."

In 1985, a rare Australian promotional video was shot for the single. On May 21, 1985, the song was featured on American Bandstands rate-a-record segment. Up against B.E. Taylor Group's "Reggae Rock & Roll", "Boy" won the competition with a score of 84.

Chart performance
Although the song failed to reach the Billboard Hot 100 chart, it did make the top 10 on the Billboard Hot Dance Club Play chart, where it peaked at No. 7 in April 1985.

2000 remixes
In 2000, the song was remixed by noted club DJ Peter Rauhofer, as well as Headrillaz, Dubaholics, RPO, and re-released to dance clubs in late 2000/early 2001. These remixes, including an almost ten-minute-long version by Rauhofer, again charted on the Billboard Club Play chart under the title "Boy (Remixes)", this time reaching No. 1 on the dance chart in February 2001. Both the original version of "Boy" as well as an edit of the remix by Rauhofer were included on Book of Love's greatest hits album, I Touch Roses: The Best of Book of Love, in 2001.

In 2001, a promotional video remix titled 'Big Red Mix' was made for the album edit of the Peter Rauhofer remix using footage from the band's 1989 appearance at Bill Graham's In Concert Against AIDS benefit show in San Francisco.

Track listings1985 7" single (Sire)Side A
"Boy" - 3:02

Side B
"Book of Love" - 4:311985 12" maxi-single (Sire)Side A
"Boy" (Extended Mix) - 4:28
"Boy" (Dub) - 5:00
Side B
"Boy" - 3:02
"Book of Love" - 4:312000 2 x 12" promo (Reprise)Side A
"Boy" (Peter Rauhofer Club Mix) - 9:59
Side B
"Boy" (Headrillaz Extended Vocal Mix) - 7:10
"Boy" (Headrillaz Dub) - 3:30
Side C
"Boy" (Peter Rauhofer Dub) - 8:18
Side D
"Boy" (Headrillaz Club Dub) - 4:47
"Boy" (A Cappella) - 3:242001 12" promo (Reprise)Side A
"Boy" (Dubaholics Remix) - 6:11
"Boy" (Dubaholics Dub) - 5:13
Side B
"Boy" (RPO Remix) - 6:40
"Boy" (Sound Bisquit "Blame" Dub) - 8:002001 2 x 12" single (Reprise)Side A
"Boy" (Peter Rauhofer Club Mix) - 9:59
Side B
"Boy" (Headrillaz Extended Vocal Mix) - 7:10
"Boy" (Headrillaz Dub) - 3:30
Side C
"Boy" (Dubaholics Remix) - 6:11
"Boy" (Dubaholics Remix) - 5:13
Side D
"Boy" (Peter Rauhofer Dub) - 8:18
"Boy" (RPO Remix) - 6:402001 CD single (Reprise)"Boy" (Peter Rauhofer Club Mix) - 9:59
"Boy" (Peter Rauhofer Dub) - 8:18
"Boy" (Headrillaz Extended Vocal Mix)" - 7:09
"Boy" (Headrillaz Dub) - 5:32
"Boy" (RPO Remix) - 6:40
"Boy" (Dubaholics Remix) - 6:11
"Boy" (Dubaholics Dub) - 5:13
"Boy" (Original 12" Version) - 4:27
"Boy" (Sound Bisquit "Blame" Dub) -8:00

 Charts 

In popular culture
The song is played during a club scene in the episode "Limbo" of the American television series Halt and Catch Fire, and during a bar scene in the film Fun Mom Dinner.

 Personnel 
Written by Theodore Ottaviano.

 Jade Lee - drums
 Ted Ottaviano - keyboards, bells
 Lauren Roselli - keyboards
 Susan Ottaviano - lead vocals1985 version vredits Engineered by Steve Peck
 Recorded and mixed at Unique Recording, NYC
 Mastered with Herb Powers at Frankford Wayne, NYC
 Produced by Ivan Ivan
 Cover concept by Book of Love and Zoë Brotman
 Art direction by Zoë Brotman/Studio Zed2001 remixes credits'
 Remix A&R coordination tracks 3-9 (CD): Bill Coleman for Peace Bisquit, NYC.
 Remix and additional production on Peter Rauhofer Remix (Big Red Mix), Peter Rauhofer Club Mix, Peter Rauhofer Dub, A Capella, by Peter Rauhofer for Unique Productions, NYC.
 Remix and additional production on Headrillaz Extended Vocal Mix, Headrillaz Dub, Headrillaz Club Dub, by Headrillaz (Caspar Kedros and Darius Kedros) at The Bunker. Edits by Albert Cabrera for One Rascal.
 Postproduction and remix on RPO Remix by Rick Pier O'Neil at RPO Traxx, France.
 Remixing on Dubaholics Remix and Dubaholics Dub by The Dubaholics for Dubaholics Productions at the Asylum Studios, UK. Rhodes: Antony Gorry. Bass licks: Mall.
 Production and remix on Sound Bisquit "Blame" Dub by Ted Ottaviano and Bill Coleman for Peace Bisquit and Sound Umbrella. Mixed by Doug McKean at World of Beauty, NYC.
 Cover art by Bill Jacobson, copyright 1993, Interim portrait #525, courtesy of Julie Saul Gallery, NYC.
 Art direction and design by Ethan Trask.

Official versions

" * " denotes that version is available as digital download.

See also
List of number-one dance hits (United States)

References

External links
 
 
 
1985 12" single release at discogs.com
2001 12" single release at discogs.com

1985 debut singles
2001 singles
Book of Love (band) songs
LGBT-related songs
Songs about loneliness
Sire Records singles
1985 songs